Vonetta Flowers (born October 29, 1973) is an American bobsledder. In 2002 Winter Olympics, Flowers became the first African American and the first Black athlete from any country to win a gold medal at a Winter Olympics.

Career
Flowers was a star sprinter and long jumper at the University of Alabama at Birmingham, and originally aspired to make the U.S. Summer Olympics. After several failed attempts, Flowers turned to bobsledding, and found success as a brakewoman almost immediately. At the 2002 Winter Olympics, she, along with driver Jill Bakken, won the gold medal in the two-woman event, becoming the first African American woman to win a gold medal in the Winter Olympics. After the Salt Lake City Games, Flowers gave birth to twins and took some time off from the sport. In 2003, she returned to competition with new driver Jean Prahm. Flowers and Prahm competed in the 2006 Winter Olympics in Turin, finishing sixth.

Flowers also won the bronze medal in the two-woman event at the 2004 FIBT World Championships in Königssee. She retired from competition after the 2006 Winter Olympics.

In December 2010, she was elected to the Alabama Sports Hall of Fame. She was inducted as a member of the Class of 2011 in May.

References

2006 bobsleigh two-woman results
Bobsleigh two-woman Olympic medalists since 2002
Bobsleigh two-woman world championship medalists since 2000
FIBT profile
Official website
United States Olympic Committee profile
Alabama Sports Hall of Fame Class of 2011

1973 births
Living people
African-American female track and field athletes
American female bobsledders
Bobsledders at the 2002 Winter Olympics
Bobsledders at the 2006 Winter Olympics
Olympic gold medalists for the United States in bobsleigh
Sportspeople from Birmingham, Alabama
University of Alabama at Birmingham alumni
American female sprinters
American female long jumpers
Medalists at the 2002 Winter Olympics
People from Helena, Alabama
21st-century African-American sportspeople
21st-century African-American women
20th-century African-American sportspeople
20th-century African-American women